The 1120s was a decade of the Julian Calendar which began on January 1, 1120, and ended on December 31, 1129.

Significant people
 Al-Mustarshid
 Pope Honorius II

References